Günther Gehmert (9 February 1913 – 13 June 1940) was a German athlete. He competed in the men's high jump at the 1936 Summer Olympics. He was killed in action during World War II.

Personal life
Gehmert served in the German Army during the Second World War. He died of wounds in France on 13 June 1940.

References

External links
 

1913 births
1940 deaths
Athletes (track and field) at the 1936 Summer Olympics
German male high jumpers
Olympic athletes of Germany
Place of birth missing
German Army personnel killed in World War II
German Army personnel of World War II
Military personnel from Berlin